Manuel Mena (born 9 February 1946) is an Argentine alpine skier. He competed in the men's slalom at the 1964 Winter Olympics.

References

1946 births
Living people
Argentine male alpine skiers
Olympic alpine skiers of Argentina
Alpine skiers at the 1964 Winter Olympics
Sportspeople from Bariloche